HMS E8 was a British E-class submarine built at Chatham Dockyard. She was laid down on 30 March 1912 and was commissioned on 18 June 1914. She cost £105,700. During World War I, she was part of the British submarine flotilla in the Baltic.

Design

The 'Group 1' E class boats were armed with four 18 inch (450 mm) torpedo tubes, one in the bow, one either side amidships, and one in the stern; a total of eight torpedoes were carried. Group 1 boats were not fitted with a deck gun during construction, but those involved in the Dardanelles campaign had guns mounted forward of the conning tower while at Malta Dockyard.

E-Class submarines had wireless systems with  power ratings; in some submarines, these were later upgraded to  systems by removing a midship torpedo tube. Their maximum design depth was  although in service some reached depths of below .

Crew
E8′s complement was three officers and 28 men.

Service history
When war was declared with Germany on 5 August 1914, E8 was based at Harwich, in the 8th Submarine Flotilla of the Home Fleets.

E8 and E6 then made the first Heligoland Bight patrol of World War I.

On 23 October 1915, E8 sank the 9,050-ton, three-funnel German armoured cruiser   in the Baltic Sea west of Libau. As the result of this action the submarine's commander, Commander Francis Goodhart, received the Cross of St. George from Tsar Nicholas II. During her time in the Baltic, Aksel Berg, who later became the founder of Soviet cybernetics, was her liaison officer.

Fate

E8 was salvaged in August 1953 for breaking up in Finland.

References

External links

 

British E-class submarines of the Royal Navy
Ships built in Chatham
1913 ships
World War I submarines of the United Kingdom
World War I shipwrecks in the Baltic Sea
Royal Navy ship names
Maritime incidents in 1918
Shipwrecks of Finland
Scuttled vessels of the United Kingdom